2X or 2-X may refer to:

A typographic approximation of 2×, or multiplication by 2
"two power"/"two times" magnification
A typographical or transcription error of 2x, or Power of two
A shortcut for the term twice
Saab 9-2X
LG Optimus 2X
Double scull in rowing
J-2X, a model of J-2 (rocket engine)
Nord Lead 2X; see Nord Lead
2X Software
2X, a 2016 album by Lil Durk

See also
2 X Again, a 2007 album by Michael Angelo Batio
X2 (disambiguation)